Magic Circle Music was founded by Manowar bassist Joey DeMaio in 2005 named after Richard Wagner's Der Ring des Nibelungen. The purpose of the label is to give the band (Manowar) creative control. Furthermore, it is stated on their website that they (Manowar) saw many other bands "fall to the perils of greed and commercialization in the music industry". To put an end to this practice, DeMaio founded Magic Circle Music through which he felt he could help other developing artists avoid these traps.

Apart from releasing band merchandise, the label is also responsible for organizing the Magic Circle Festival, which first took place in 2007 in Bad Arolsen, Germany.

Roster
 Bludgeon
 David Shankle Group
 Feinstein
 Guardians of the Flame
 Jack Starr's Burning Starr
 Luca Turilli
 Luca Turilli's Dreamquest
 Majesty (formerly "Metalforce")
 Manowar
 Rhapsody of Fire

See also
Manowar discography

References

Record labels established in 2005
Heavy metal record labels
American independent record labels